KMPI may refer to:

 Mariposa-Yosemite Airport (ICAO code KMPI)
 KMPI (FM), a radio station (90.5 FM) licensed to serve McCoy, Texas, United States